Chilak-e Olya (also Romanized as Chīlak-e ‘Olyā; also known as Chīlak-e Bālā) is a village in Baladeh Kojur Rural District, in the Central District of Nowshahr County, Mazandaran Province, Iran. In 2006, its population was 369, in 92 families.

References 

Populated places in Nowshahr County